Eliška Březinová (born 19 February 1996) is a Czech figure skater. She is the 2019 EduSport Trophy champion, the 2014 New Year's Cup champion, the 2015 Santa Claus Cup champion, a two-time Four Nationals champion (2014, 2018), and a nine-time Czech national champion (2012, 2014–2016, 2018–2022). She has competed in the final segment at eight ISU Championships, including three World Championships.

Personal life 
Eliška Březinová was born on 19 February 1996 in Brno, Czech Republic. She is the daughter of Edita and Rudolf Březina, a figure skating coach, and the younger sister of Michal Březina, a former competitor in men's singles.

Career 
Březinová began skating in 2002. She debuted on the ISU Junior Grand Prix series in 2010. In the 2011–2012 season, she became the Czech national senior champion and was sent to the European and World Championships but did not progress past the preliminary round at either event.

In the 2012–2013 season, Březinová dipped to fourth nationally and placed 30th in Zagreb at the 2013 European Championships, missing the cut-off for the free skate. She underwent ankle surgery in May 2013. She was coached by Karel Fajfr, along with her father, until the end of the season, and then by Ivan Rezek and her father beginning in the summer of 2013.

In the 2013–2014 season, Březinová won her second national title and reached the free skate at the 2014 European Championships in Budapest, where she finished fifteenth. She then qualified for the free skate at the 2014 World Championships in Saitama and finished eighteenth.

Březinová made her Grand Prix debut in the 2014–2015 season, having been assigned to the 2014 Trophée Éric Bompard. She won the Czech Figure Skating Championships for the third time. She finished fifteenth at the 2015 European Championships in Stockholm. 

Competing at the 2021 World Championships, Březinová placed twenty-second. This result qualified a place for the Czech Republic at the 2022 Winter Olympics. In September of 2021 she was named to the Czech Olympic team, joining her four-time Olympian brother for the first time. Březinová placed eighth in the short program segment of the Olympic team event, setting a new personal best score and breaking the 60-point mark for the first time. She performed still better in the short program of the women's event, scoring 64.31 to qualify for the free skate in twelfth position. Twenty-first in the free skate, she dropped to twentieth overall.

Programs

Competitive highlights 
GP: Grand Prix; CS: Challenger Series; JGP: Junior Grand Prix

Detailed results

Senior level 
Small medals for short and free programs awarded only at ISU Championships. At team events, medals awarded for team results only. ISU Personal bests in bold. Historical ISU Personal bests in bold italic.

References

External links 

 
 Eliska Brezinova at Tracings.net

1996 births
Czech female single skaters
Living people
Figure skaters from Brno
Competitors at the 2017 Winter Universiade
Competitors at the 2019 Winter Universiade
Figure skaters at the 2022 Winter Olympics
Olympic figure skaters of the Czech Republic